Alain Moyne-Bressand (born 30 July 1945) was a member of the National Assembly of France from 1988 to 2017.  He represented Isère's 6th constituency. He was a member of various parties through this time; UDF,  Republican Party, Union for a Popular Movement and The Republicans.

References

1945 births
Living people
People from Bourgoin-Jallieu
Union for French Democracy politicians
Liberal Democracy (France) politicians
Union for a Popular Movement politicians
The Strong Right
Deputies of the 12th National Assembly of the French Fifth Republic
Deputies of the 13th National Assembly of the French Fifth Republic
Deputies of the 14th National Assembly of the French Fifth Republic